Alexia Barlier (born 21 December 1982) is a French actress.

Life and career
Barlier was born to a mother from New Zealand who worked as a classical dancer and yoga teacher. Her father ran art galleries. She was brought up in both the French and English languages. Parallel to school, she attended the Cours Simon in Paris, where she received her acting training.

Barlier made her film debut in 2002 as Kate in 24 Hours in the Life of a Woman. In the 2006-07, she performed at Théâtre Montparnasse in Paris in La Danse de l'Albatros by Gérald Sibleyras. In 2007, she was seen as Magda in the film adaptation of the novel Conversations with My Gardener. From 2010 to 2014, she played the role of Nadia Martinez in the crime series La Loi selon Bartoli and from 2013 to 2016, she played the role of Éva Blum in the television series Falco.

In 2016, Barlier starred in Michael Bay's action film 13 Hours: The Secret Soldiers of Benghazi as Sona Jillani, an undercover CIA officer. In 2017, she took on the role of teacher Eve Mendel in the miniseries The Forest. In 2019, she played the role of Juliette Dubrovsky in the mystery series La Dernière Vague.

In 2021, Barlier starred in the three-part television series Crossroads in the title role as former defense attorney and investigator Sophie Cross at the side of Thomas Jouannet as her husband Thomas Leclercq.

Personal life
Barlier is married to Paul Leyden, having done so in 2018. They have a daughter and live in Los Angeles.

Filmography

Film

Television

References

External links
 
Official Website

1982 births
Living people
French film actresses
French television actresses
People from Neuilly-sur-Seine
French people of New Zealand descent
21st-century French actresses